Zimbabwe competed at the 2012 Summer Paralympics in London, United Kingdom from August 29 to September 9, 2012.

Athletics 

Men's Track and Road Events

Wheelchair Tennis

See also

 Zimbabwe at the 2012 Summer Olympics

References

Nations at the 2012 Summer Paralympics
2012
2012 in Zimbabwean sport